12 de Octubre is a Panama Metro station on Line 1. Construction of the station began on 17 March 2012 and it was one of the first 11 stations when the metro began operations on 6 April 2014. It is the first of six elevated stations when travelling towards the San Isidro terminus.

Located in the district of the same name, the station is the closest to Panamá Viejo, the original site of Panama city. In its first year of operations, 12 de Octubre was the eighth most used station of the twelve on the network at that time, carrying 8% of the system's users at peak times.

References

Panama Metro stations
2014 establishments in Panama
Railway stations opened in 2014